Albert Frick (18 September 1714 – 30 May 1776) was a German theologian.

He was born at Ulm on 18 September 1714 and died on 30 May 1776. He studied at Leipsic, and was appointed assessor (judge) to the faculty of theology. In 1743 he became minister at Jungingen, but, returning to Ulm in 1744, filled the post of librarian and professor of morals. In 1751 he went to Munster as preacher; and in 1768 was named head librarian. Among his writings are Historia traditionum ex monumentis Ecclesiae Christianae (Ulm, 1740): — De Natura et Constitutione Theologie Catecheticae (Ulm, 1761–64, 4to). — Hoefer, Nouv. Biog. Generale, 18:871.

References

1714 births
1776 deaths
People from Ulm
German theologians
German librarians